Tel Aviv railway station may refer to:

Tel Aviv HaHagana railway station, the southernmost station in the city
Tel Aviv HaShalom railway station, one of the busiest stations in Israel
Tel Aviv Savidor Central railway station, the city's main station
Tel Aviv South railway station, two former stations in the city
Tel Aviv University railway station, the northernmost station in the city